The Dawn is a rural residential locality in the Gympie Region, Queensland, Australia. In the  The Dawn had a population of 545 people.

Geography
Mary Valley Road (State Route 51) forms part of the western boundary.

The Mary Valley Branch Railway passes through from north-east to south, where the line forms part of the south-eastern boundary. The former Dawn railway station served the locality. 

The Dawn is a mostly rural-residential area dependent upon Jones Hill and Southside for facilities. The eastern part of the locality is used for grazing on native vegetation.

There are two hills in the locality:

 Dawn Hill
 James Hill

History
At the  The Dawn had a population of 683 people.

In the  The Dawn had a population of 545 people.

Education 
There are no schools in The Dawn. The nearest government primary school is Jones Hill State School in neighbouring Jones Hill to the north-west. The nearest government secondary school is Gympie State High School in Gympie to the north.

References

Gympie Region
Localities in Queensland